Radke is a German surname and may refer to:

 Alfred Radke (born 1934), German sports shooter
 Bill Radke, American radio talk show host, web video host, author, comedian and columnist
 Brad Radke (born 1972), American Major League Baseball pitcher
 Doug Radke, pastor of the Hermannsburg Lutheran church, Australia, that led the Hermannsburg Choir on tour in 1967
 Hubert Radke (born 1980), Polish professional basketball player
 Lina Radke (1903–1983), German runner
 Olga Radke, musician, wife of Doug Radke, writer of a book about the Hermannsburg Choir tour
 Ronnie Radke (born 1983), American musician, songwriter & producer
 Roy Radke (born 1996), American ice hockey player
 Ted Radke (born 1958), Australian politician
 Trina Radke (born 1970), American competition swimmer

German-language surnames